Bala Kəhrizli (also, Bala Kyagrizli and Kyagrizli-Akhmedbeyli) is a village and municipality in the Aghjabadi Rayon of Azerbaijan.  It has a population of 1,106.

References 

Populated places in Aghjabadi District